The Masaryk Democratic Party (MDS) is a centrist political party in the Czech Republic, founded on 25 May 1992. The party follows the legacy of the first Czechoslovak President Tomáš Garrigue Masaryk and considers itself a successor and to the tradition of the historical Czech Realist Party.

History

In the 2002 and 2006 municipal elections, the party co-operated with the Czech National Social Party and the Party for the Open Society. In the 2014 Czech Senate election, party leader Michal Chromec was a candidate in the Přerov district on the united list of the Czech Social Democratic Party, but failed to qualify for the second round.

Leaders
Otomar Venzhöfer (2001–2012)
Michal Chromec (since 2012)

References

External links
 Masaryk Democratic Party – Facebook page

Centrist political parties in the Czech Republic
Pro-European political parties in the Czech Republic
1992 establishments in Czechoslovakia
Political parties established in 1992